St. George Illawarra Dragons Women are a rugby league team, representing both the Illawarra and St George regions of New South Wales. The team is part of the St. George Illawarra Dragons club and plays in the National Rugby League Women's Premiership.

Current squad 
The St. George Illawarra Dragons have announced that the following players have signed to play with the club in the 2022 NRL Women's season. Jumper numbers in the table reflect the order that signatures were announced.  

The team is coached by Jamie Soward.  

Table last updated on 5 Oct 2022.

Notes:
 Emma Tonegato played in the New South Wales women's rugby league team in 2012 and 2013.
 In 2021, Teagan Berry ( 9m 11t), Keele Browne  8m 3t), and Chantel Tugaga ( 7m 2t) played for Illawarra in the Tarsha Gale Cup for Under 19s.
 In 2021, Tegan Dymock ( 1m) and Zali Hopkins  9m 2t) played for Cronulla in the Tarsha Gale Cup for Under 19s.
 In 2021, Fatafehi Hanisi played for St George ( 11m 2t) in the Tarsha Gale Cup for Under 19s. She was contracted for the Parramatta Eels in the postponed 2021 NRLW season, but did not play.
 In 2022, Monalisa Soliola (Canterbury ( 6m 4t 5g) played in the Tarsha Gale Cup for Under 19s and represented New South Wales Under 19 women against Queensland on 23 June 2022. 
 In 2022, Andie Robinson represented New South Wales Under 19 women against Queensland on 23 June 2022, scoring a hattrick of tries in the match. Robinson had not appeared in the 2022 Tarsha Gale Cup competition.
 Salma Nour played for the Illawarra Steelers in the Tarsha Gale Cup in both the 2021 ( 9m 5t 1g) and 2022 ( 7m 10t) seasons. Nour was selected in the extended squad for New South Wales in the 2022 Under 19 State of Origin but was not included in the playing 17 for that match.

Seasons

Club Records

Player Records 
Lists and tables last updated: 4 October 2022.

Most Games for the Dragons
 Keeley Davis  23, Holli Wheeler  20, Kezie Apps  19, Shaylee Bent  19.
Most Tries for the Dragons
 Teagan Berry  10, Madison Bartlett  6, Jessica Sergis  5, Emma Tonegato  5, Quincy Dodd  5.
Most Points for the Dragons (20+)

Most Points in a Season (16+)

Head-to-head records

Notes
 Share % is the percentage of points For over the sum of points For and Against.
 Clubs listed in the order than the Dragons Women first played them.

Margins and Streaks 
Biggest winning margins
 

Biggest losing margins

Most consecutive wins
 3  (20 March 2021  3 April 2021)

Most consecutive losses
 4  (6 October 2019  17 October 2020)

History 
In December 2017, the St. George Illawarra Dragons expressed their interest in applying for a licence to participate in the inaugural NRL Women's season. In March 2018, they were awarded one of four licences for the league's inaugural season, to commence in September of the same year. 

Daniel Lacey was appointed to coach the side.

In June 2018, Sam Bremner, Kezie Apps and Talesha Quinn were unveiled as the club's first three signings.

The Dragon's first NRLW match was played on Sunday, 9 September. 2018. Captain Sam Bremner scored the Dragons' first try, in a 304 loss to the Brisbane Broncos. The Dragons' first win occurred in their second match, against the New Zealand Warriors on Sunday, 15 September 2018. The Dragons won by a margin of 2210.

Players 
The following players have appeared in NRL Women's Premiership matches for the Dragons.
Table last updated: 4 October 2022.

References

External links
 

 
NRL Women's Premiership clubs
Rugby league teams in Sydney
Rugby league teams in Wollongong
Women's rugby league teams in Australia